NJF can stand for:

 Norwegian Union of Railway Workers (Norsk Jernbaneforbund)
 Norsk Jazzforum or its predecessor Norsk Jazzforbund
 Norwegian Judo Federation
 Al Najaf International Airport (IATA code)
 Nicholas J. Fuentes (political commentator)